William Saurin Lyster (21 March 1828 – 27 November 1880), often referred to as W. Saurin Lyster, was an impresario, active in Australia.

Early life 

Lyster was born in Dublin, Ireland, the third son of Chaworth Lyster, a captain in the army, and his wife Anne, née Keightly. His uncle was William Saurin, Attorney-General for Ireland. The Saurin family was partly of French Huguenot extraction. Another of his uncles was James Saurin, Bishop of Dromore. At the age of 13, Lyster, after an illness, was sent on a voyage around the world and visited Sydney and Melbourne in 1842. After his return to England, he went to India intending to become a planter, but the climate not suiting him, he again returned to England. In 1847, he was in South Africa and fought in the 7th Cape Frontier War, and a year later, was in the United States where he tried his fortunes as an actor with little success.

Impresario career 
In 1855, Lyster was a member of General Walker's expedition to Nicaragua with the rank of captain. About two years later, he formed an opera company which included Madame Lucy Escott, Henry Squires, and Miss Georgia Hodson whom he married. This company had some success in the western states of America, and in 1861 Lyster brought it to Australia. For about seven years it gave performances of the operas of Italian, German, French and English composers, including Don Giovanni in 1861, and the Les Huguenots in 1862. Other companies were brought out in later years, and at times comic opera was alternated with grand opera. His opera company gave 1,459 performances between 1861 and 1869.

Classic operas like Lohengrin, opened on 18 August 1877, and Tannhäuser in 1878, were box office failures, although the company had included a distinguished singer, Antoinetta Link. Lyster, however, made the lighter operas bear the cost of others which were artistic successes only. Among other European singers engaged by Lyster were Signor Pietro Paladini and Madame Fanny Simonsen, grandmother of Frances Alda. The Australian tenor, Armes Beaumont joined his company in 1870. Among concert artists introduced to Australia were pianists Arabella Goddard and Henry Ketten, and Jules Levy, a well-known English cornet player of the period. Lyster's companies toured the principal cities of Australia and New Zealand, but for the last seven years of his life he made the Tivoli Theatre, Melbourne, his headquarters. Though best known for his productions of operas, he was interested also in the drama, and seasons were played at the opera house by the distinguished actress Madame Ristori, and by good comedy companies.

Death 
Lyster fell into bad health about 1877 and never fully recovered. He died in Melbourne on 27 November 1880 and was survived by his wife, there were no children. Lyster was buried in the Anglican section of the Melbourne General Cemetery.

References

1828 births
1880 deaths
Irish emigrants to colonial Australia
Opera managers
Impresarios
Opera in Australia
Music in Melbourne
British military personnel of the 9th Cape Frontier War